Ban Kok Kok is a muban (village) in Kok Tum Sub-district, Dong Luang District, Mukdahan Province, Isan region (northeast Thailand).

History
Originally, Bang Kok Kok and adjacent Ban Kok Tum were part of Na Kae District, Nakhon Phanom Province, because at that time, Mukdahan Province had not yet been established. Ban Kok Kok was one of the 30 villages scattered in the valley on the boundary between three provinces; Nakhon Phanom–Sakon Nakhon–Kalasin. The ethnic group are Phu Thai and Bru.

The terrain in this area is considered to be surrounded by the Phu Phan Mountain Range, the stronghold of the Communist Party of Thailand (CPT) during the Cold War era (1960s–early 1980s).

In 1965, the CPT sent its members to incite the locals to believe in communism and join the action against the government. Since then, Ban Kok Kok (included Ban Kok Tum) also fell under the influence of the CPT, and considered as "red zone", especially during the years 1968–1982. Ban Kok Kok was used as a campsite for government troops.

After 1982, the situation had changed, when members of the CPT surrendered to the government, this makes the tension in the area better.

During this period, a road called "Prem Phatthana" (ถนนเปรมพัฒนา; named after Gen Prem Tinsulanonda, a Prime Minister at that time) was built through the village connects to Khao Wong District, Kalasin Province, bringing prosperity to the area.

By September 1982, Mukdahan Province was formally established as a secession from Nakhon Phanom.

For Dong Luang was upgraded from a king amphoe (กิ่งอำเภอ, minor-district) to a full district on July 27, 1984, divided into six sub-districts, and 60 villages.

Geography
Ban Kok Kok is adjacent to Chan Phen Sub-district, Tao Ngoi District, Sakon Nakhon Province in north, where there are two villages on the mountains, Ban Kuan Boon and Ban Bueng Sa. The locals can therefore contact other communities on the plain by two routes, namely on the side of Na Kae District and Tao Ngoi District. Most of the geography is a plateau interspersed with sandstone hills.

Economy
Most of the population is engaged in rice farming and rubber plantation. Farming of bandicoot rat is another occupation that generates income for the community.

Hot issue
Ban Kok Kok was originally a small, quiet and remote village in the rural area, less known to most people. But since May 11, 2020, due to the mysterious disappearance of a local three-year-old girl of Phu Tai descent Orawan "Nong Chompoo" Wongsicha has made this place famous and in the interest of Thai people across the country. Everyone insisted that this was a place that a small child like her couldn't come up with alone. 

Hundreds of Bangkok police have been on the field to investigate, seek evidence and interrogate numerous witnesses and suspects. The media coverage of this case was directed at one of the suspects, Chaiphol "Lung Phol" Wipha, the girl's uncle-in-law, and made him famous for a short time like a superstar. Even though many are criticizing the case as an example of serious news being twisted into entertainment.

As a result, there are more visitors to Ban Kok Kok, even organized tours to come here, that made some villagers have a changed way of life.

References

Populated places in Mukdahan province